Syllabical and Steganographical Table (French: Tableau syllabique et stéganographique) is an eighteenth-century cryptographical work by P. R. Wouves. Published by Benjamin Franklin Bache in 1797, it provided a method for representing pairs of letters by numbers. It may have been the first chart for cryptographic purposes to have been printed in the United States.

References 

1797 non-fiction books
American non-fiction books
History of cryptography
Cryptography books
Works of uncertain authorship
Benjamin Franklin